is a Japanese actor.

Television roles

Tokusatsu
Choukou Senshi Changéríon (1996) – Akira Suzumura/Changerion
Kamen Rider Ryuki (2002-2003) – Takeshi Asakura/Kamen Rider Ouja
Kamen Rider Decade (2009) – Takeshi Asakura/Kamen Rider Ouja (cameo)

Anime television
Yugo the Negotiator (2004) - Yūgo Beppu

Original Video Animation (OVA)
Hunter × Hunter: G.I. Final (2004) - Biscuit Krueger (adult form)

Partial filmography
Kids Return (1996)
Kamen Rider Ryuki: Episode Final (2002) – Takeshi Asakura/Kamen Rider Ouja
Kamen Rider Den-O: I'm Born! (2007) – Cobra Imagin (Voice)
Kamen Rider Decade: All Riders vs. Dai-Shocker (2009) – Takeshi Asakura/Kamen Rider Ouja (cameo)
"Kamen Rider Brave: Let's Survive! Revival of the Beast Riders" (2017) - Takeshi Asakura/Kamen Rider Ouja

External links
 Profile at Nagara Pro

1973 births
Living people
Hagino, Takashi